Carol Lynne Martin (born 1948) is a former track-and-field athlete in discus, shot put and javelin. She represented Canada at the Commonwealth Games in 1966, 1970 and 1974, on each occasion winning the bronze medal for women's discus throw. She also represented Canada at the Pan-American Games, earning the silver medal for discus in 1967 and the bronze in 1971. Martin competed in discus at the Pacific Conference Games, winning silver in 1969 and gold in 1973. Martin competed on Canada's national track and field team for 10 years and held the Canadian women's title in discus for seven years.

Martin trained at the Don Mills Track Club in Toronto, Ontario, where she was coached by Lloyd Percival, an early adopter of interval training and massage.

In the early 1970s she enrolled at Simon Fraser University, helping to bring attention to the underfunded women's athletics programs there. She returned to Toronto and completed her B.A. at York University in 1975.

Following her athletic career, Martin coached and taught fitness classes, and became a registered massage therapist (RMT) in 1982.  She became associated with the International Network of Esoteric Healing, and after 25 years of practise published Breathe: An Enlightened Living Hand Book in 2014.

Works

References

Living people
Simon Fraser University alumni
York University alumni
Canadian female discus throwers
Sportspeople from Barrie
1948 births
Athletes (track and field) at the 1974 British Commonwealth Games
Athletes (track and field) at the 1970 British Commonwealth Games
Athletes (track and field) at the 1966 British Empire and Commonwealth Games
Commonwealth Games medallists in athletics
Commonwealth Games bronze medallists for Canada
Athletes (track and field) at the 1967 Pan American Games
Athletes (track and field) at the 1971 Pan American Games
Pan American Games medalists in athletics (track and field)
Pan American Games silver medalists for Canada
Pan American Games bronze medalists for Canada
Medalists at the 1967 Pan American Games
Medalists at the 1971 Pan American Games
Medallists at the 1966 British Empire and Commonwealth Games
Medallists at the 1970 British Commonwealth Games
Medallists at the 1974 British Commonwealth Games